Edison Park Creative and Expressive Arts Elementary School is an elementary school in Fort Myers, Florida. The school has drama, music education and dance programs. It is part of the Lee County School District. The historic building, formerly Edison Park School, is located at 2401 Euclid Avenue and was added to the U.S. National Register of Historic Places on May 5, 1999.

This property is part of the Lee County Multiple Property Submission, a Multiple Property Submission to the National Register.

References

 Lee County listings at National Register of Historic Places
 Florida's Office of Cultural and Historical Programs
 Lee County listings
 Edison Park Elementary School

External links

 Edison Park Creative and Expressive Arts Elementary School - official site

Public elementary schools in Florida
National Register of Historic Places in Lee County, Florida
Schools in Lee County, Florida
Education in Fort Myers, Florida
Buildings and structures in Fort Myers, Florida